Ismo Kanerva (born 3 June 1942) is a Finnish rower. He competed in the men's coxed four event at the 1964 Summer Olympics.

References

1942 births
Living people
Finnish male rowers
Olympic rowers of Finland
Rowers at the 1964 Summer Olympics
Sportspeople from Turku